Senator Engler may refer to:

John Engler (born 1948), Michigan State Senate
Kevin P. Engler (born 1959), Missouri State Senate